Barbecue chicken consists of chicken parts or entire chickens
that are barbecued, grilled or smoked. There are many global and regional preparation techniques and cooking styles. Barbecue chicken is often seasoned or coated in a spice rub, barbecue sauce, or both. Marinades are also used to tenderize the meat and add flavor. Rotisserie chicken has gained prominence and popularity in U.S. grocery markets. Barbecued chicken is one of the world's most popular barbecue dishes.

Preparation
Various techniques exist for cutting poultry for barbecuing, including skewering, butterflying, halving quartering and using individual pieces. Many diverse cooking and flavoring techniques exist for this dish.

Regional variations

Regional variations in the preparation of barbecue chicken include culinary variance in preparation, cooking and saucing techniques.

Asia
In Asia, barbecue chicken is sometimes cubed and marinated in a spiced soy-based sauce, then threaded onto skewers and grilled.

India

In India, similar variations of barbecue chicken like Chicken tikka and Tandoori chicken is eaten.

Mongolia
In Mongolia, the term shashlyks may refer to barbecue chicken.

Thailand
Kai yang, also sometimes referred to as Gai Yang, is a popular barbecue chicken street food in Thailand. This dish has many variations.

Australia
Grilled chicken wings are a popular dish in Australia. Some Australian take-away stores purvey rotisserie chicken.

Europe

Portugal

Frango no churrasco is a Portuguese barbecue chicken dish. Piri piri peppers are sometimes used to flavor the dish. In Portugal, frango de churrasco is a common grilled chicken dish that is prepared at many churrascarias in the country. Portuguese churrasco and chicken dishes are very popular in countries with Portuguese communities, such as Canada, Australia, the United States, Venezuela and South Africa.

Ukraine
In Ukraine, the terms shashlyks or kurka refers to Barbecue chicken.

North America
In North America, barbecue chicken is often seasoned with a spice rub, then coated with a tomato based barbecue sauce, and grilled. Some versions only use a spice rub and don't use sauce. Barbecue chicken can also be prepared in pressure cookers, in which the chicken is cooked inside the cooker with barbecue sauce, and in slow cookers.

Canada
Barbecue chicken is a popular dish in French Canadian fast food restaurants.

Caribbean

In Cuba, some palladores (privately run Cuban restaurants) offer barbecue chicken. Additionally, street vendors may offer the dish.

In Jamaica, barbecued chicken flavored with Jamaican jerk spice is a common dish. In the past, spices and wild chili peppers were used to preserve meat in Jamaica.

In the French West Indies, Buccaneer-style chicken is a popular dish. A modern preparation involves marinating chicken for 24 hours in a mixture of lime, spices, vegetables, vinegar and other ingredients, and then smoking the chicken.

Mexico
Street food stalls that serve breakfast and lunch dishes, called Loncherias, sometimes offer barbecue chicken.

United States
In Alabama, egg or mayonnaise-based white sauces are sometimes served with barbecue chicken at the table as a dipping sauce. This has been described in the book 1,000 Places to See in the United States and Canada Before You Die as being more common in Northern Alabama, particularly in Northwest Alabama. Per the same book, barbecue in Southern Alabama tends to have sauces that are tomato-based.

California Pizza Kitchen, a restaurant chain founded in California, is the original creator of barbecue chicken pizza.

In the U.S. state of Georgia, slightly sweet sauces with mustard are used on chicken.

In Western North Carolina, thin tomato and vinegar based sauces are common.

In rural Pennsylvania, egg is sometimes used to make the skin on the chicken crispy. In Kentucky, chicken is a favorite meat for barbecuing along with lamb and mutton.

In Texas, barbecue usually refers to ribs, but many barbecue restaurants in Texas serve barbecue chicken seasoned with rub, sometimes called "dalmatian rub", that is made of salt and pepper. The chicken is often served with a very hot vinegar or even beer-based barbecue sauce. Texas barbecue tends to be slow-smoked, rather than grilled.

Beer can chicken involves the indirect grilling a whole chicken on a barbecue grill using steam from beer (or another liquid) as a flavoring agent and cooking medium.

Rotisserie chicken

See also

 Ayam bakar
 Barbecue sandwich
 Buffalo wing
 Fried chicken
 Jujeh kabab
 Shish taouk
 List of barbecue dishes
 Regional variations of barbecue
 Roasting
Beer can chicken

References

Citations

Sources 
 Adler, Karen; Fertig, Judith M. (2005).The Barbecue Queens' Big Book of Barbecue. Harvard Common Press. p. 217. 
 Stines, Michael H. (2005) Mastering barbecue: tons of recipes, neat techniques, great tips and indispensable know how Ten Speed Press, 
 Purviance, Jamie; McRae, Sandra S. (2001). Weber's Big Book of Grilling. Chronicle Books. 
 Raichlen, Steven (2001). How to Grill: The Complete Illustrated Book of Barbecue Techniques, a Barbecue Bible! Cookbook. Workman Publishing. 
 Raichien, Steven (2008).The Barbecue Bible. 10th Anniversary Edition. Workman Publishing.

Further reading
 Flay, Bobby; (et al.) (2010). Bobby Flay's Throwdown!: More Than 100 Recipes from Food Network's Ultimate Cooking Challenge. Random House Digital, Inc. p. 255. 
 Raichlen, Steven (2000). Barbecue! Bible: Sauces, Rubs, and Marinades, Bastes, Butters, and Glazes. Workman Publishing. p. 234. 
 Raichlen, Steven (2003). BBQ USA. Workman Publishing,. pp. 382–386.  Information about a barbecue chicken dish named "Cornell Chicken"

External links
 

Chicken dishes
Barbecue